The Aerosport OY Spider is a family of Estonian paramotors that was designed and produced by Aerosport OY of Keila for powered paragliding. Now out of production, when the series were available the aircraft were supplied complete and ready-to-fly.

Design and development
The Spider line was designed to comply with the US FAR 103 Ultralight Vehicles rules as well as European regulations. It features a paraglider-style wing, single-place accommodation and a single engine in pusher configuration with a reduction drive. The basic design is built from  aluminium tubing, plus a nylon harness. The various models employ different engine, reduction drive and propeller combinations.

As is the case with all paramotors, take-off and landing is accomplished by foot. Inflight steering is accomplished via handles that actuate the canopy brakes, creating roll and yaw.

Variants
Spider F33
Model with a single Hirth F33  engine, a 2.2:1 ratio reduction drive and a  diameter propeller
Spider F33 BL
Model with a single Hirth F33  engine, a 2.7:1 ratio reduction drive and a  diameter propeller
Spider M21Y
Model with a single Cors'Air M21Y  engine and a 2.48:1 ratio reduction drive and a  diameter propeller
Spider M21Y BL
Model with a single Cors'Air M21Y  engine, a 2.6:1 ratio reduction drive and a  diameter propeller
Spider PS2000
Model with a single PS2000  engine, a 2.5:1 ratio reduction drive and a  diameter propeller
Spider Racket
Model with a single Radne Raket 120  engine, a 3.8:1 ratio reduction drive and a  diameter propeller
Spider Solo
Model with a single Solo 210  engine and a 2.5:1 ratio reduction drive and a  diameter propeller

Specifications (Spider F33)

References

Spider
2000s Estonian ultralight aircraft
Single-engined pusher aircraft
Paramotors